Diospyros rhombifolia, the diamond-leaf persimmon or princess persimmon, is a species of flowering plant in the family Ebenaceae, native to southeast China. A shrub or tree reaching , and hardy to USDA zone 7b, it is widely cultivated as an ornamental for its small leaves and attractive orange fruit.

References

rhombifolia
Ornamental trees
Plants used in bonsai
Endemic flora of China
Flora of Southeast China
Plants described in 1889